Korbolikha is a rural locality (a selo) and the administrative center of Korbolikhinsky Selsoviet, Tretyakovsky District, Altai Krai, Russia. The population was 1,281 as of 2013. There are 13 streets.

Geography 
Korbolikha is located 14 km north of Staroaleyskoye (the district's administrative centre) by road. Staroaleyskoye is the nearest rural locality.

References 

Rural localities in Tretyakovsky District